Charles Masson (1800–1853) is a British East India Company soldier, explorer and amateur archaeologist.

Charles Masson may also refer to:
Charles Masson (ice hockey) (1884–1954), Canadian ice hockey player
Charles Masson (field hockey), (born 1992), French field hockey player
Charles Masson Sr., founder and owner of the restaurant Le Grenouille
Charles Masson Fox (1866–1935), Cornish businessman